Abrotanella diemii is a member of the daisy family and is an endemic species of southern Argentina, (Neuquén).

References

Flora of Argentina
diemii
Taxa named by Ángel Lulio Cabrera